The United States National Time Trial Championships are held annually to decide the American champions in this cycling discipline, across various age and gender categories. Originally, in 1975, the time trial event distance was 25 miles. It later changed to 40 km, and still later changed to the current distance of 32.3 kilometers (20.1 miles).

The winners of each event are awarded with a symbolic cycling jersey which is red, white and blue, just like the national flag, these colors can be worn by the rider at other time trialling events in the country to show their status as national champion. The champion's stripes can be combined into a sponsored rider's team kit design for this purpose.

In the past, professional riders were included in the United States Cycling Federation's Elite Men's National Time Trial Championship event. But since the professional aspect of the sport continues to grow in America, a separate championship for male professional riders was introduced in 2006, known as the USPRO championships. They were held along with the USPRO Road Race championships in Greenville, South Carolina, on Labor Day weekend, on a 32.3 km course (20.1 miles), the same course has been used for each USPRO championship since. This championship is open to any male U.S. citizen on a UCI-registered trade team. This introduction of a professional championship is contrary to the development of the sport in many other countries, in Great Britain for example, separate championships for amateur and professional riders were scrapped in the early nineties, this allowed many unsponsored riders to gain recognition by competing directly against their sponsored counterparts.

Multiple winners 

Men

Women

Men

Elite

U23

Women

See also
United States National Criterium Championships
United States National Road Race Championships

References

Women's results

External links 
USA Cycling
USA Cycling Pro Championships
USA Cycling National Champions

National road cycling championships
Cycle races in the United States
Recurring events with year of establishment missing
1975 establishments in the United States
Recurring sporting events established in 1975